KROZ-LP (105.9 FM, The Cross) is a radio station broadcasting a religious radio format, licensed to Hobbs, New Mexico, United States. The station is currently owned by First Bi-Lingual Christian Ministerial Association and features programming from USA Radio Network.

References

External links
 

ROZ-LP